ARCA or Arca may refer to:

Companies 
 Arca-Filmproduktion GmbH, the German film production company of Gero Wecker
 Arca Fondi SGR, Italian asset management company
 Arca South, an industrial estate in the Philippines
 ARCAspace, an aerospace company based in Las Cruces, New Mexico
 NYSE Arca, an online stock exchange previously known as Archipelago

Equipment 
 Arca-Swiss style tripod head (camera equipment)
 arca (document store), alternately spelled archa
 Astroparticle Research with Cosmics in the Abyss, part of the KM3NeT neutrino telescope

Organizations 
 The American Russian Cultural Association, founded by Nicholas Roerich in 1942
 Association for Research into Crimes against Art, a non-profit organization based in Rome
 Automobile Racing Club of America, a stock car racing sanctioning formed in 1953 by John Marcum
 ARCA Menards Series, the premier division of ARCA
 Automobile Racing Club of America, a sports car racing organization formed by the Collier Brothers in 1933 that was a forerunner of the Sports Car Club of America
 Associate of the Royal College of Art

People

Arts and entertainment 
 Arca (musician) (born 1989), a Venezuelan musician
 Arca (album), the eponymous 2017 album by Arca

Sports 
 Julio Arca (born 1981), an Argentine football (soccer) player

Places 
 Arça or Arsk, a townlet in Tatarstan, Russia
 Arca Caesarea, former bishopric became a double Catholic titular see (Latin and Maronite), present-day Arqa

Other uses 
 Arca (bivalve), a genus of ark clams

See also
 Arc (disambiguation)